Clothkits is an English clothing company, originally based in Lewes, East Sussex. Founded as a mail order business by Anne Kennedy in 1969 and sold in 1988, Clothkits at one stage employed 400 workers and had 7 shops. The name continued to be used for a short time after the takeover of the company by Freemans, a larger mail order catalogue business, and was discontinued in 1991.

Clothkits specialized in selling pre-printed kit clothing for children and adults, with colorful prints designed under the guidance of Janet Kennedy. The kit would comprise a pattern printed onto the fabric so that it could be cut out and assembled without needing to pin a paper pattern. The kits were also notable for containing all the materials needed to complete the garment. The spare fabric around the pieces of the main pattern would often feature a doll sized pattern for the same garment. As well as the printed kits, they sold ready-made clothing and coordinating knitted items such as jumpers and tights.

After a period of hibernation, the Clothkits brand was bought in 2007 by artist Kay Mawer and the company relaunched in early 2008.  Clothkits continue to produce kit clothing, also available pre-assembled, inspired by the original concept. Collaborations with contemporary artists and designers form the core of the business, and partnerships include with screen printer Jane Foster, papercut artist Rob Ryan and designers People Will Always Need Plates. Such kits have seen renewed interest due to concerns about the sustainability of ready-to-wear fast fashion.

References

Continue reading

External links
 

Sewing
Clothing companies of the United Kingdom
Companies based in East Sussex
1969 establishments in England
English brands